Innisfail Estate is a rural locality in the Cassowary Coast Region, Queensland, Australia.

Geography 
Innisfail Estate is bounded by the Johnstone River to the east, south and west. It is connected to Innisfail to the west across the river  by the Geraldton Bridge (Geraldton being the former name of Innisfail).

Rocky Point is at the south-east of the locality on the Johnstone River.

The south-western part of the locality near the bridge is suburban. The east of the locality is undeveloped wetlands. The remainder of the locality is used for agriculture, predominantly growing sugarcane.

History 

In 1879 Thomas Henry Fitzgerald came to North Queensland looking for locations suitable to grow sugarcane. He was impressed by the potential of the Johnstone River district. Returning to Brisbane he established a company Fitzgerald & Co with the assistance of Roman Catholic Bishop of Brisbane James O'Quinn. On 23 April 1880 he returns to the area and establishes the first sugarcane plantation (called Innisfail Estate) with its own sugar mill. The mill closed in 1885 but by then there were a number of other mills in the Johnstone River district.

By the 1940s there was a cane tramway through the Innisfail Estate, with a ferry connection for the tramway across the Johnstone River (approx )  to Innisfail and from there to the sugar mill.

Education 
Innisfail State College is a government primary and secondary (Early Childhood-12) school for boys and girls at 45 Flying Fish Point Road. In 2017, the school had an enrolment of 856 students with 85 teachers (81 full-time equivalent) and 57 non-teaching staff (43 full-time equivalent). It includes an early childhood developmental program, a diverse learning centre, and a special education program.

There is no primary school in Innisfail Estate. The nearest government primary school is Innisfail State School in Innisfail across the river to the west. Catholic primaryand secondary schools are also in Innisfail.

References 

Cassowary Coast Region
Localities in Queensland